Westfälische Kammerspiele  is a theatre in Paderborn, North Rhine-Westphalia, Germany.

Theatres in North Rhine-Westphalia